Sam Powell (born 3 July 1992) is an English rugby league footballer who plays as a  or  for the Wigan Warriors in the Super League and the England Knights at international level. 

He has spent time on dual-registration from Wigan with Workington Town in the Championship and with the South Wales Scorpions in League 1. After signing for Wigan as a youngster his first team début came in a 2012 Super League game against Hull FC.

Background
Powell was born in Wigan, Greater Manchester, England.

Club career

Wigan Warriors 
Powell signed for the Wigan academy aged 16 and progressed through the ranks winning the Academy Grand Final against Warrington in 2011.

2012 
Powell got his debut for Wigan against Hull F.C. during August, scoring a try in the 48-10 victory. He started at scrum-half after Brett Finch suffered a hamstring injury.

2013 
Powell made 16 appearances scoring tries against Hull KR, London Broncos and Huddersfield Giants. His kicking game was one of the reasons for his run in the team, a long range drop goal winning the game against Widnes Vikings in early June. Powell was then called up to the England Knights squad alongside fellow Warriors Dominic Crosby, Iain Thornley and Scott Taylor. He made his debut for the side against Samoa scoring two tries in the 52-16 victory.

2014 
Powell was handed the number 19 shirt for the new season and made 22 appearances scoring against Bradford Bulls, Salford Red Devils and Hull FC. Half way through the season coach Shaun Wane decided to experiment with the halfback pairing, moving George Williams from hooker to stand off, with Powell starting at dummy half. This would become a permanent switch after Williams impressed in the halves. 

He was part of the team that lost the 2014 Super League Grand Final to St. Helens at Old Trafford in a game famous for a Ben Flower red card.

2015 
The new Super League season play 23 times for the Wigan club with more appearances coming from the bench showing a positional change from halfback to hooker. His only try of the season came against Hull F.C. in late July. 

He made his second appearance at Old Trafford losing out to the Leeds Rhinos in a tense 2015 Super League Grand Final.

2016 
Powell was handed the number 16 shirt for the new season, an early indication that he would be playing mainly from the bench replacing Michael McIlorum at hooker. This however was not to be the case after McIlorum suffered a fractured and dislocated ankle against the Brisbane Broncos in just the third game of the season. Despite initial speculation that Wigan would have to bring in a replacement Powell made the role his own playing 36 times playing on many occasions 80 minutes per game. Tries again St. Helens, Castleford Tigers, Wakefield Trinity and Hull F.C. ensured it was his most successful season in both appearances and scores. 

He won the Super League Grand Final on the third time of asking in a tense affair which saw the Wigan Warriors beat the Warrington Wolves 12-6 at Old Trafford.

2017 
With McIlorum still out injured, Powell started the season at hooker and played his 100th game for the Wigan club in the 22-6 World Club Challenge victory over the Cronulla-Sutherland Sharks. McIlorum returned in the Good Friday derby against St. Helens but Powell kept his place in the team making 31 appearances in all competitions scoring twice and kicking 6 goals.

He played in the 2017 Challenge Cup Final defeat by Hull F.C. at Wembley Stadium.

2018 
The departure of McIlorum meant that Thomas Leuluai was handed the number 9 shirt with Powell moving to the number 7.

He played in the 2018 Super League Grand Final victory over the Warrington Wolves at Old Trafford.

2019
Powell played 25 games for Wigan in 2019 as they suffered a shock semi-final loss against Salford.

2020
Powell played in the 2020 Super League Grand Final which Wigan lost 8-4 against St Helens.

International career
In July 2018 he was selected in the England Knights Performance squad. Later that year he was selected for the England Knights on their tour of Papua New Guinea. He played against Papua New Guinea at the Lae Football Stadium and the Oil Search National Football Stadium.

In 2019 he was selected for the England Knights against Jamaica at Headingley Rugby Stadium.

Career Statistics

References

External links
Wigan Warriors profile
SL profile

1992 births
Living people
England Knights national rugby league team players
English rugby league players
Rugby league five-eighths
Rugby league halfbacks
Rugby league players from Wigan
South Wales Scorpions players
Wigan Warriors players
Workington Town players